Ernesto Mallo (born 1948) is an Argentine writer. He was born in La Plata in the province of Buenos Aires. He has published in a wide variety of genres including stage plays, cinema scripts, essays and short stories. However, he is best known for his novels, the first of which (La aguja en el pajar) appeared in 2006. Since then, he has published several more novels.

Two of his books in the "Inspector Lascano" series have been translated into English: Needle in a Haystack, translated by Jethro Soutar, and Sweet Money, translated by Katherine Silver.

Play scripts 
La vacuna (1973)
Siete cuadros (1977)
Qué mambo el de Colón (1982)

Movie scripts 
La aguja en el pajar (2007)
Maidana con todo (2007) (en colaboración con Juan Desanzo)
Delincuente argentino (2007)

TV scripts 
Imperio Chico (2012)
Será Justicia (2014)

Short stories 
Bautizo y otros cuentos (Eudeba, 1974)

Anthologies 
Buenos Aires Noir (inglés), Akashic Books, New York, 2017.
Barcelona Negra, Ediciones Siruela, Madrid, 2016.
Madrid Negro, Ediciones Siruela, Madrid, 2016.
Tiempos Negros, Ediciones Siruela, Madrid, 2017.
Buenos Aires Noir, Akashic Books, New York, 2017.
Músicas Negras, Ediciones Siruela, Madrid, 2017.

Non-fiction 
Ferrum Cien Años, Editorial Franz Viegener, Buenos Aires, 2011.
Buenos Aires Street Art, La Marca Editora, Buenos Aires, 2011.

Novels 
La aguja en el pajar, Editorial Planeta, Buenos Aires 2006.
Delincuente argentino, Editorial Planeta, Buenos Aires, 2007.
L'aiguille dans la botte de foin, Payot & Rivages, Paris, 2009.
El Relicario, Editorial Planeta, Buenos Aires, 2010.
Der tote von der Plaza Once, Aufbau Verlag, Berlín, 2010.
Needle in a haystack, Bitter Lemon Press, Londres, 2010.
Der barfüBige polizist von der calle San Martín, Aufbau Verlag, Berlín, 2010.
Crimen en el Barrio del Once, Ediciones Siruela, Buenos Aires, 2011.
El Policía Descalzo de la Plaza San Martín, Ediciones Siruela, Madrid, 2011.
Los Hombres te han hecho mal, Editorial Planeta, Buenos Aires, 2012.
Los Hombres te han hecho mal, Ediciones Siruela, Madrid, 2012.
El Comisario Lascano, Ediciones Siruela, Madrid, 2014.
La Conspiración de los Mediocres, Ediciones Siruela, Madrid, 2015.
La Conspiración de los mediocres, Penguin, Random House, Mondadori, Buenos Aires, 2015.
El Hilo de Sangre, Ediciones Siruela, Madrid, 2018.

References

Argentine male novelists
Argentine dramatists and playwrights
Argentine male short story writers
Argentine screenwriters
Argentine crime fiction writers
Male dramatists and playwrights
Male screenwriters
20th-century Argentine novelists
20th-century Argentine male writers
20th-century dramatists and playwrights
21st-century Argentine novelists
21st-century Argentine male writers
21st-century dramatists and playwrights
People from La Plata
1948 births
Living people
20th-century Argentine short story writers
21st-century Argentine short story writers